"Si Tú No Vuelves" (English: "If You Don't Come Back") was first released in 1993 as the lead single for Miguel Bosé's studio album Bajo el Signo de Caín.

Background and release 
The song was written by Bosé, Lanfranco Ferrario and Massimo Grilli. For the international edition of the album an Italian adaptation was recorded, Se Tu Non Torni, and an English lyrics one titled "They're only words" from the English language album Under the sign of Cain.

Track listing

Amaral and Chetes version
In 2006, a cover version of the song was recorded by Spanish duo Amaral and Mexican singer Chetes was released as the first single of the soundtrack of the Mexican movie Efectos Secundarios.

Miguel Bosé and Shakira version 
The song is a re-make of Miguel Bosé's song featuring the Colombian artist Shakira and is included on the former's album Papito. "Si Tú No Vuelves" was first released in Italy and it was recorded by Gustavo Celis in Panama. The song was a success in Italy, reaching at 2 on the chart.

The song is slow and melodic, and gradually reaches a climax where Shakira ends the song.

Chart

Miguel Bosé and Ha*Ash version 

The song is a re-make of Miguel Bosé's song featuring the American duo Ha*Ash and is included in Ha*Ash's live album Ha*Ash: En Vivo (2019). It was written by Bosé, Lanfranco Ferrario and Massimo Grilli.

Music video 
The music video for "Si Tú No Vuelves", recorded live for the live album Ha*Ash: En Vivo, was released on December 6, 2019. The video was filmed in Auditorio Nacional, Mexico City.

Live performances 
Miguel Bosé and Ha*Ash performed "Si Tú No Vuelves" for the first time at the "Festival de Viña del Mar" on February 20, 2018. On November 11, 2018, they appeared on Auditorio Nacional, and also performed "Si Tú No Vuelves".

Charts and commercial performance 
The track peaked one on the Monitor Latino in Mexico.

Weekly charts

Year-end charts

References

External links
 
 
 

2007 singles
1992 songs
Shakira songs
Miguel Bosé songs
Ha*Ash songs
Male–female vocal duets
Spanish-language songs
Songs written by Miguel Bosé
Monitor Latino Top General number-one singles